This is a listing of American television network programs currently airing or have aired during Sunday morning or various.

Sunday morning talk programming begins at 8:00am Eastern Time Zone/Pacific Time Zone, after network affiliates' late local news, plus cable television.

Current 
All times Eastern Time Zone/Pacific Time Zone—see effects of time on North American broadcasting for explanation.

Former

Broadcast networks

PBS 

 Inside Washington (1988 – 2013; distributed by American Public Television)

Syndication 

 The Chris Matthews Show (September 22, 2002 – July 21, 2013)

Cable/satellite

CNN 

 Late Edition with Wolf Blitzer (October 3, 1993 – January 11, 2009)
 Reliable Sources (1993 – August 21, 2022)

Fox News 

 Fox News Watch (1997 – August 31, 2013)

References 

Lists of American television series
American television news shows